WAJK (99.3 FM) is a radio station  broadcasting a hot adult contemporary format. Licensed to La Salle, Illinois, United States, the station serves a large portion of North Central Illinois from the heart of Starved Rock Country.  The station is currently owned by John Spencer, through licensee Starved Rock Media, Inc., and features a variety of pop music from the 90's, 2K and today. Air personalities include Brad Spelich and Abby Zukowski in the morning, Jaimie London middays and Sean Walsh afternoons.

References

External links

993WAJK facebook

AJK
LaSalle County, Illinois